Empire Clarion was a  cargo ship which was built in 1942 by William Gray & Co. Ltd., West Hartlepool for the Ministry of War Transport (MoWT). In 1946 she was sold and renamed Cedarpool. She served until 1959, when she was scrapped.

Description
The ship was built by William Gray & Co Ltd, West Hartlepool. She was launched on 30 June 1942 and completed in September.

She had a GRT of 7,031 and a NRT of 4,916.

The engine was built by the Central Marine Engine Works, West Hartlepool.

History
Empire Clarendon was built for the MoWT. She was placed under the management of Sir R Ropner & Sons Ltd. Her port of registry was West Hartlepool. The Code Letters BDZD and United Kingdom Official Number 168944 were allocated.

Empire Clarion was a member of a number of convoys during the Second World War.

UR 46
Convoy UR 46 departed from Loch Ewe on 18 October 1942 and arrived at Reykjavík, Iceland on 22 October.

JW 52
Convoy JW 52 departed from Liverpool on 17 January 1943 and arrived at the Kola Inlet on 27 January. Empire Clarion was carrying the convoy's Commodore.

RA 53
Convoy RA 52 departed from the Kola Inlet on 1 March 1943 and arrived at Loch Ewe on 14 March.

HX 239
Convoy HX 239 departed from New York on 13 May 1943 and arrived at Liverpool on 28 May. Empire Clarion joined the convoy from Halifax, Nova Scotia. She was carrying a cargo of grain and lorries, she was bound for Avonmouth, Somerset.

In 1946, Empire Clarion was sold to the Pool Shipping Co Ltd. She was renamed Cedarpool, remaining under Ropner's Management. On 21 December 1948, she was chartered by the Australian Shipping Board. 11 December 1951 Empire Clarion was chartered by BHP Shipping Ltd. The charter lasted until 1955. On 20 July 1959, Cedarpool arrived at Hamburg, West Germany for scrapping.

References

External links
Photo of Cedarpool

1942 ships
Ships built on the River Wear
Empire ships
Ministry of War Transport ships
Steamships of the United Kingdom
Merchant ships of the United Kingdom